Theano of Crotone was a 6th-century BC Pythagorean philosopher. She has been called the wife or student of Pythagoras, although others see her as the wife of Brontinus. Her place of birth and the identity of her father are uncertain as well. Some authors have suggested that there was more than one person whose details have become merged (these are sometimes referred to as Theano I and Theano II). Theano is considered by some to be the first known woman mathematician. She may have worked on The Golden Mean and The Golden Rectangle.

Life
Little is known about the life of Theano. According to one tradition, she came from Crete and was the daughter of Pythonax, but according to others she came from Crotone and was the daughter of Brontinus. She was said by many to have been the wife of Pythagoras, although another tradition made her the wife of Brontinus. Iamblichus, in an attempt to resolve the confusion, refers to Deino as the wife of Brontinus.

The children variously ascribed to Pythagoras and Theano included three daughters, Damo, Myia, and Arignote, and a son, Telauges. Suda writes that her children with Pythagoras were Telauges, Mnesarkhos, Myia and Arignote.

Pythagoras opened up a school in Croton in Italy which primarily involved mathematics, philosophy, and nature. It is thought that Pythagoras accepted women and men in his school and at one point achieved 300 students in school while only 28 students were women. As multiple sources indicate, Pythagoras wanted to compete with other schools so he made his school not based on discrimination of genders, which influenced other women to pursue science and astronomy instead of being discriminated. It was also spoken that many men were inspired by the women studying in school. As Pythagoras neared the end of his life, Theano took over as the head of the school with the help of her children. With Theano's life ending, the school still existed, even after 200 years after the deaths of both Theano and Pythagoras. Theano died during the 5th century B.C. and was thought to be buried right by their school.

Writings
The writings attributed to Theano were: Pythagorean Apophthegms, Female Advice, On Virtue, On Piety, On Pythagoras, Philosophical Commentaries, and Letters. None of these writings have survived except a few fragments and letters of uncertain authorship. Attempts have been made to assign some of these fragments and letters to the original Theano (Theano I) and some to a later Theano (Theano II), but it is likely that they are all pseudonymous fictions of later writers, which attempt to apply Pythagorean philosophy to a woman's life. The surviving fragment of On Piety concerns a Pythagorean analogy between numbers and objects; the various surviving letters deal with domestic concerns: how a woman should bring up children, how she should treat servants, and how she should behave virtuously towards her husband.

According to Thesleff, Stobaeus, and Heeren, Theano wrote in On Piety:

Although some sources have claimed that Theano wrote about either the doctrine of the golden mean in philosophy, or the golden ratio in mathematics, there is no evidence from the time to justify this claim.

As mentioned earlier, Theano wrote quite a bit of treatises, which is any sort of written work that deals formally and systematically in a certain subject. Theano wrote a few of these treatises which involved medicine, physics, mathematics, and psychology.  During Theano's writing period she brought a few historical writings for us, which include Cosmology, The Theorem of the Golden Mean, The Theory of Numbers, and The Construction of the Universe. Out of all these writings it is said that, The Theorem of the Golden Mean, is the most conflicted writing due to the fact that Theano had made many arguable points.  Because Theano wrote about the universe and planets in this writing, there might be some arguable points that other philosophers can make, for example Theano states that the stars are unable to move, but Aristotle would say the opposite, and say that they are able to move. The Theorem of the Golden Mean, is still used today and is one of Theano's most important writings.

It is not uncommon for the works of women, especially those who worked alongside more famous men like Pythagoras, to not receive the credit they deserve from the work that they did. This might also contribute to part of her allure. She remains a mystery for many people, but they all agree that she worked alongside Pythagoras and that she published various different works under different pseudonyms. She is considered to be an extremely intelligent woman, based on her continuous education at the school her husband taught at. A lot of her credit got lost due to the fact that her husband was a more well known philosopher and because women of the time. Although there are varying accounts of her work and private life, there are some non-academic anecdotal stories that are considered to be true. For example, “Theano was walking along one day when her elbow came uncovered.  Somebody commented that it was a beautiful elbow. She said, “Yes, but not a public one!"

There is a belief among some scholars that the writings which are thought to have been written by Theano were actually written by men who used this as a pseudonym. To continue, for men to have published work under her name, it would have to be true that this would give them recognition for their work. This is not necessarily the case because even Theano’s own work has not been attributed to her, and she did not have as high of a social standing as Pythagoras. It is true that in the specific society that Pythagoras studied, women were considered to be equal, although in practice and in time, this is not found to be entirely true.

References

17. Dancy, R. M. "On A History of Women Philosophers, Vol. I." Hypatia 4, no. 1 (1989): 160-71. Accessed December 9, 2020. http://www.jstor.org/stable/3809942.

18. DeBakcsy, D., Dale DeBakcsy is the writer and artist of the Women In Science and Cartoon History of Humanism columns, Wysk, LaRocco, L., Contributor, G., & Name*. (2019, February 27). Theano of Croton And The Pythagorean Women Of Ancient Greece. Retrieved December 10, 2020, from https://womenyoushouldknow.net/theano-of-croton-pythagorean/

19. Lindemann, K. (n.d.). Theano_of_Crotona. Retrieved December 9, 2020, from http://www.societyforthestudyofwomenphilosophers.org/Theano_of_Crotona.html

20. Wider, Kathleen. "Women Philosophers in the Ancient Greek World: Donning the Mantle." Hypatia 1, no. 1 (1986): 21-62. Accessed December 9, 2020. http://www.jstor.org/stable/3810062.

Further reading
Kai Brodersen, Christoph M. Wieland, (2010), Theano: Briefe einer antiken Philosophin. Greek/German. Reclams Universal-Bibliothek 18787, Stuttgart.

External links

"Theano", Biographies of Women Mathematicians, Agnes Scott College

6th-century BC Greek people
6th-century BC Greek women
6th-century BC philosophers
Ancient Greek mathematicians
Ancient Greek women philosophers
Ancient Crotonians
Pythagoreans
Pythagoreans of Magna Graecia
Women mathematicians
Year of birth unknown
Year of death unknown
6th-century BC mathematicians